The Saint Helena Altarpiece is a three-panelled oil on panel painting by Jacopo Palma il Vecchio, created c. 1524–1525, now in the Pinacoteca di Brera in Milan.

From left to right it depicts Saint Roch, emperor Constantine the Great, the True Cross, Constantine's mother Saint Helena and Saint Sebastian.

References

Paintings of Saint Sebastian
Paintings in the collection of the Pinacoteca di Brera
1525 paintings
Paintings of Saint Roch
Paintings of Saint Helena
Paintings by Palma Vecchio
Constantine the Great and Christianity